The Trouble Buster is a lost 1917 American drama silent film directed by Frank Reicher, written by Tom Forman and Gardner Hunting, and starring Vivian Martin, James Neill, Paul Willis, Charles West, Louise Harris, and Mary Mersch. It was released on October 8, 1917, by Paramount Pictures.

Plot
As described in a film magazine, after the death of her father, Michelna (Martin) is threatened with being sent to an orphan's asylum. She escapes and becomes the companion of "Blackie" Moyle (Willis), a newsboy. Donning his clothes she too sells newspapers. One night she is lured to a flat by Tip Morgan (West), a crook. Blackie rescues her, but in the struggle is blinded. Michelna has a statue that she has made and calls the Trouble Buster. She takes it to an art exhibit and it gains immediate favor. Blackie is given the credit for the statue, and with the money from the statue is able to get an operation which restores his sight. Michelna has taken an abode with some suburban folks where she works as the maid. One day while she is paying Tip some "silence" money, Blackie enters the scene, drives Tip away, and declares his love for her.

Cast 
Vivian Martin as Michelna Libelt
James Neill as Franz Libelt
Paul Willis as "Blackie" Moyle
Charles West as Tip Morgan
Louise Harris as Mrs. Camden
Mary Mersch as Ruth Camden
Vera Lewis as Mrs. Westfall

Reception
Like many American films of the time, The Trouble Buster was subject to cuts by city and state film censorship boards. The Chicago Board of Censors required a cut of a scene with the crook striking a boy on the head with a bottle.

References

External links 
 

1917 films
1910s English-language films
Silent American drama films
1917 drama films
Paramount Pictures films
American black-and-white films
American silent feature films
Lost American films
1917 lost films
Lost drama films
Films directed by Frank Reicher
1910s American films